Ptiliolum is a genus of beetles belonging to the family Ptiliidae.

The species of this genus are found in Europe and Northern America.

Species:
 Ptiliolum africanum Peyerimhoff, 1917 
 Ptiliolum atlanticum Peyerimhoff, 1917

References

Ptiliidae